Air Chief Marshal Sir Christopher Lloyd Courtney,  (27 June 1890 – 22 October 1976) was a senior Royal Air Force officer.

RAF career
Courtney joined the Royal Navy in May 1905 as a midshipman at Britannia Naval College. By late 1909 he was an acting sub-lieutenant on board .

He fought in the First World War initially as Officer Commanding Killingholme Royal Naval Air Station. He continued his war service as Officer Commanding Royal Naval Air Station Dover, Officer Commanding No. 4 Wing RNAS and then Officer Commanding No. 7 Squadron RNAS. In April 1918, with the creation of the Royal Air Force, Courtney transferred from the Navy to the RAF and at that time he was appointed deputy director of Aircraft Equipment at the newly established Air Ministry. Just before the end of World War I, Courtney was promoted to acting brigadier-general and sent France to command the 11th Brigade which was being established as a subordinate formation of the RAF's Independent Air Force.  However, once the armistice was declared, the Independent Air Force's commander, Major-General Sir Hugh Trenchard, returned home and Courtney succeeded him as commander.

After the war he served as Officer Commanding, No 2 (Indian) Wing and then after a tour on the Directing Staff at the RAF Staff College, Andover, he was appointed deputy director of Operations and Intelligence at the Air Ministry. He briefly served as Air Officer Commanding RAF Iraq Command on a temporary basis in late 1932. He was made Director of Training at the Air Ministry in 1933, Director of Staff Duties in 1934 and Deputy Chief of the Air Staff and Director of Operations & Intelligence in 1935. After that he was appointed Air Officer Commanding RAF Iraq Command in 1937 and Air Officer Commanding-in-Chief Reserve Command in February 1939. He became Air Member for Supply and Organisation in January 1940 and remained in that post throughout the remainder of the Second World War until he retired in 1945.

References

External links

Liddell Hart Centre for Military Archives web page on Air Chief Marshal Sir Christopher Courtney.

|-

|-
 

|-

|-

|-
 

|-

|-

1890 births
1976 deaths
Royal Air Force generals of World War I
Royal Air Force air marshals
People educated at Bradfield College
Knights Grand Cross of the Order of the British Empire
Knights Commander of the Order of the Bath
Companions of the Distinguished Service Order
Recipients of the Order of St. Anna, 3rd class
Chevaliers of the Légion d'honneur
Commanders of the Legion of Merit